is a passenger railway station in located in the city of Kinokawa, Wakayama Prefecture, Japan, operated by the private railway company Wakayama Electric Railway.

Lines
Kishi Station is a terminal station of the Kishigawa Line, and is located 14.3 kilometers from the opposing terminus of the line at Wakayama Station.

Station layout
The station consists of one deadheaded side platform serving a single bi-directional track. The station is staffed.

Adjacent stations

History

Kishi Station opened on August 18, 1933. On February 1, 2010, the Kishi Station building was closed and demolished. Construction began on a new station facility in March, with the cat-themed new complex opened in July.

Kishi Station was known for Tama the stationmaster cat, who became the mascot for the station until she died in June 2015. The cat held the official position as Super Station Master. Tama was succeeded as Station Master by another cat, named Nitama.

Since renovation, the station is housed in a cat-face-shaped building, with a Tama-theme cafe, with cat theme chairs and cakes. There is a souvenir shop with a wide range of stationery (pens, staplers and others) and Kishi Station uniforms. The Wakayama Electric Railway operates three cat-themed trains: Strawberry, Tama, and Toy. The feline stationmaster works on Friday–Tuesday (10am–4pm) and is off duty on Wednesday and Thursday.

Passenger statistics

Gallery

Surrounding Area
former Kishigawa Town Hall
Kinokawa City Nakatakashi Elementary School

See also
List of railway stations in Japan

References

External links

  Kishi Station timetable

Railway stations in Japan opened in 1933
Railway stations in Wakayama Prefecture
Kinokawa, Wakayama